This is a list of Nigerian films released in 2014.

Films

See also
List of Nigerian films

References

External links
2014 films at the Internet Movie Database

2014
Lists of 2014 films by country or language
Films